The following is a list of senators in the 27th Parliament of Canada.

Names in bold indicate senators in the 19th Canadian Ministry, and the 20th Canadian Ministry appointed before the parliament was dissolved.

See also
List of current senators of Canada

References

27
27th Canadian Parliament